Soure is a Brazilian municipality located in the northern state of Pará, on the island of Marajó, which is located in the Amazon River at its mouth. Its population as of 2020 is estimated to be 25,565 people. The area of the municipality is 3,512.863 km2. The city belongs to the mesoregion Marajó and to the microregion of Arari.

The municipality is contained in the  Marajó Archipelago Environmental Protection Area, a sustainable use conservation unit established in 1989 to protect the environment of the delta region.
It contains the  Soure Marine Extractive Reserve, a sustainable use conservation area created in 2001 that protects the coastal mangroves to the north of the municipal seat and along the north part of the Paracauari River.

Notable People from Soure, Pará
 Ildemar Alcântara, Brazilian mixed martial artist, former UFC fighter and younger brother of Iuri Alcântara.
 Iuri Alcântara, Brazilian mixed martial artist, UFC fighter and older brother of Ildemar Alcântara.
 Deiveson Figueiredo, Brazilian mixed martial artist, UFC fighter, former two-time UFC Flyweight Champion.

Climate 
Soure has a tropical monsoon climate (Köppen: Am), with different amounts of precipitation depending on the season.

References

Municipalities in Pará
Populated coastal places in Pará